Johan Hoel (born 17 December 1994) is a Norwegian cross-country skier.

Overview 
At the 2014 Junior World Championships he competed in four events, winning a gold medal in relay and the bronze medal in the 20 km skiathlon. He also competed at the 2016 and 2017 Junior World Championships, now in the U23 age class, with a 10th place as best.

He made his World Cup debut in March 2015 at the Holmenkollen 50 km, not finishing the race however. He collected his first World Cup points in the 2016 edition of the same race, finishing 18th. In the 2017–18 World Cup circuit he competed three times, managing a 13th place in Planica, but in 2018–19 he again only competed in the Holmenkollen 50 km, this time with a 16th place.

He represents the sports club Åsen IL, originally Frogner IL.

Cross-country skiing results
All results are sourced from the International Ski Federation (FIS).

World Cup

Season standings

References 

1994 births
Living people
People from Sørum
Norwegian male cross-country skiers
Sportspeople from Viken (county)
21st-century Norwegian people